RV Neil Armstrong (AGOR-27) is the designation for a new oceanographic research ship, first of the s, to be owned by the United States Navy and operated by Woods Hole Oceanographic Institution. Secretary of the Navy Ray Mabus announced on September 24, 2012, that the research vessel was to be named after Neil Armstrong, the first person to walk on the Moon and a former naval aviator who served in the Korean War.

The ship was constructed by Dakota Creek Industries of Anacortes, Washington and scheduled for completion in 2014 for entry into service in 2015.

It was launched on 29 March 2014, christened by Carol Armstrong, passed sea trials 7 August 2015 and delivered to the Navy on 23 September 2015.  A sister ship, was launched 9 August 2014 to be operated by Scripps Institution of Oceanography under a renewable charter-party agreement.

Construction
Neil Armstrong is a commercially designed mono hull research vessel, capable of coastal and deep ocean oceanography operations, and equipped with cranes and winches for over-the-side loading of research equipment and supplies, as well as accommodations for twenty-four scientists. The ship is powered by a multi-drive low-voltage diesel electric propulsion system for efficiency and lower maintenance and fuel costs. Both Neil Armstrong-class ships have state of the art oceanographic equipment allowing deep ocean mapping and information technology for ship monitoring and worldwide land-based communication.

Labs
Neil Armstrong has more than 130 square meters of adjustable lab space, supplied by a flash evaporation desalination system.

See also 
  - Sister Ship
 RV Knorr - Predecessor to the Neil Armstrong
 RRS James Cook - British equivalent
 RRS Charles Darwin - Predecessor to the James Cook

References 

 

2014 ships
Woods Hole Oceanographic Institution
Neil Armstrong-class oceanographic research ships
RV
Ships built in Anacortes, Washington